Yudikha is a rural locality (a selo) in and the administrative center of Yudikhinsky Selsoviet, Tyumentsevsky District, Altai Krai, Russia. The population was 483 as of 2013. It was founded in 1823. There are 7 streets.

Geography 
Yudikha is located 34 km east of Tyumentsevo (the district's administrative centre) by road. Krutishka is the nearest rural locality.

References 

Rural localities in Tyumentsevsky District